Tang Liang Hong (born 1935) is a politician and lawyer from Singapore.

Tang stood as a candidate for the opposition Workers' Party in the Cheng San Group Representation Constituency at the 1997 general election. The Worker's Party team in the constituency was defeated by the team from the governing People's Action Party (PAP) by 45.2% of the votes to 54.8%.

Education 
Tang started his formal education only at the age of 13, when he began attending Yeung Ching Primary School in 1949. He graduated from high school in 1957. He then began studying at Nanyang University in 1962, and moved to the University of Singapore the following year. He graduated in 1967 and joined the bar a year later at the age of 38.

Career 
Tang served for several years as the Chairman of the Nanyang Academy of Fine Arts, and also sat on the board of management of The Chinese High School and Hwa Chong Junior College.

Political career 
Tang stood as a candidate for the Workers' Party in a five-member team for Cheng San Group Representation Constituency at the 1997 general election. The party's team in the constituency also included the party's leader, former Member of Parliament J.B. Jeyaretnam. 

During the election campaign, Prime Minister Goh Chok Tong accused Tang of being a Chinese chauvinist because of comments Tang had made at other public events in the past. Goh stated that he was therefore making himself "a special candidate" in Cheng San GRC (even though it was not his constituency) because he felt that Tang must be kept out of Parliament if Singapore's inter-racial harmony was to be protected. Tang insisted that all he had ever tried to do was to "better represent the Chinese community and ask questions on their behalf". He vigorously denied that he was a Chinese chauvinist and accused the PAP of trying to win votes by sowing fear into the electorate.

Tang also came under fire from the PAP after he raised the issue of the Hotel Properties Ltd case during the election campaign. This issue arose after the Stock Exchange of Singapore had previously criticised Hotel Properties Ltd for its "tardiness" in disclosing details of sales of its condominium units to directors and their family members. Former Prime Minister Lee Kuan Yew, who had purchased one of the units and whose brother was a director of Hotel Properties Ltd, claimed that Tang was trying to smear his name and milk this issue for political capital.

On election day, the Worker's Party's team in Cheng San GRC lost to the PAP's team by 44,132 votes (45.2%) to 53,553 (54.8%). This was the highest percentage of the vote garnered by any opposition losing candidates, and was therefore enough to secure one of the team's members a seat as a Non-Constituency Member of Parliament (NCMP). The party selected Jeyaretnam to become its NCMP.

After the election, Tang was sued for defamation by eleven PAP politicians, including Goh, Lee and Deputy Prime Ministers Lee Hsien Loong and Tony Tan, who accused him of making statements during the campaign which falsely questioned their integrity. A total of 13 judgements were entered against Tang for defamation.

Tang also subsequently faced charges from the Inland Revenue Department for evading taxes.

Tang left Singapore for Johor, Malaysia, shortly after the election. His wife's passport was then impounded but later released. Eventually Tang moved to Australia, where he was reunited with his wife.

After Tang left Singapore, the plaintiffs in the lawsuits obtained the Mareva injunction against him to restrain him from disposing of assets and to require him to disclose the whereabouts of his assets. When Tang failed to file an affidavit disclosing his assets, the plaintiffs obtained default judgements against Tang in all their suits. Damages were assessed by a judge of the High Court at a total of S$8,075,000. Tang's appeals against the default judgements were argued by the British Queen's Counsel Charles Gray before the Court of Appeal in September 1997, but was unsuccessful.

Personal life
Tang was born in 1935 to parents who came from agricultural backgrounds. He was one of eight children in his family. 

Tang has not returned to Singapore since 1997 and continues to live in Australia.

References

External links 
 Tang Liang Hong homepage

Workers' Party (Singapore) politicians
Singaporean emigrants to Australia
Singaporean people of Cantonese descent
20th-century Singaporean lawyers
1935 births
Living people